Wang Wenting (born February 3, 1997) is a Chinese pair skater. With partner Zhang Yan, she is the 2013 Chinese national silver medalist.

Programs 
(with Zhang)

Competitive highlights 
(with Zhang)

References

External links 
 

1997 births
Chinese female pair skaters
Living people
Figure skaters from Harbin